Liolaemus multimaculatus, the many-spotted tree iguana, is a species of lizard in the family Iguanidae.  It is found in Argentina.

References

multimaculatus
Lizards of South America
Reptiles of Argentina
Endemic fauna of Argentina
Reptiles described in 1837
Taxa named by André Marie Constant Duméril
Taxa named by Gabriel Bibron